Antonio Ananiev (born 8 May 1965) is a Bulgarian former professional footballer who played as a goalkeeper.

Career
Ananiev spent most of his early career in the A PFG, becoming vice-champion of Bulgaria with Slavia Sofia in 1990 and with CSKA Sofia in 1994. He also spent the last eight years of his professional career in Germany, taking up a job as a goalkeeping coach at Energie Cottbus upon his retirement.

References

External links
 
 

Living people
1965 births
Footballers from Sofia
Association football goalkeepers
Bulgarian footballers
Bulgaria international footballers
PFC Slavia Sofia players
FC Energie Cottbus players
FC Lokomotiv 1929 Sofia players
PFC CSKA Sofia players
1. FC Köln players
1. FC Lokomotive Leipzig players
Chemnitzer FC players
First Professional Football League (Bulgaria) players
DDR-Oberliga players
Bundesliga players
2. Bundesliga players
Bulgarian expatriate footballers
Expatriate footballers in East Germany
Expatriate footballers in Germany
Bulgarian expatriate sportspeople in Germany